2015–16 FFU Regions' Cup (Kubok rehioniv FFU) was the first season of the Football Federation of Ukraine new competition at regional level.  The competition is conducted among football teams of Oblasts (regions) composed of players who compete at oblast championships (regional competitions). The season kicked off on 20 September 2015 and all 25 participants were split into four divisions (Western, Central, Southern, and Eastern).

The winner of the competition was intended to represent Ukraine at the 2017 UEFA Regions' Cup. Before introduction of this competition, Ukraine was represented at the UEFA Regions' Cup usually by the winner of its amateur league (on some occasion the winner of amateur cup competition). The 2015–16 FFU Regions' Cup winner Kirovohrad Oblast consisted majorly out players of Inhulets-3 Petrove which as AF Pyatykhatska competed at the 2015 UEFA Regions' Cup.

Team allocation

Distribution

Round and draw dates

Competition schedule

Qualification round

Western Division

|}

Central Division

|}

Southern Division

|}

Eastern Division

|}

Notes

Round of 16
All games were scheduled to be played on 4 and 11 October.

Western Division

|}

Central Division

|}

Southern Division

|}

Eastern Division

|}

Notes

Quarter-finals
Games are scheduled to be played on 13 and 20 April 2016.

|}

Notes

Semi-finals
Games are scheduled to be played on 15 and 22 May 2016.

|}

Final
Final was scheduled to be played on 23 August 2016 at the Bannikov Stadium (according to the Vynnyky Plyus web portal). On 23 August 2016 the FC Inhulets Petrove official website announced that the final will take place on 30 August 2016 at the Melnyk Central Stadium in Obukhiv at 16:00.

Bracket

See also
 FFU Council of Regions

References

External links
 2015-16 FFU Regions' Cup. Football Federation of Ukraine website.
 There became apparent participants of round of 16 of the FFU Regions' Cup. UA-Football. 28 September 2015
 There took place the second leg of Round of 16 of the FFU Regions' Cup. UA-Football. 15 October 2015
 There took place quarterfinal games of the FFU Regions' Cup. Football Federation of Ukraine website. 14 April 2016
 There took place first semifinal games of the FFU Regions' Cup. Football Federation of Ukraine website. 17 May 2016
 There became known finalists of the FFU Regions' Cup. Football Federation of Ukraine. 23 May 2016
 2015-16 FFU Regions' Cup video collection on YouTube.

UAF Regions' Cup
FFU Regions' Cup
FFU Regions' Cup